Death Race is a 1973 American TV movie.

Plot
In November 1942 in the Africa desert two Allied pilots in separate planes are sent to blow up a minefield. They come across a German tank captained by an officer. The tank shoots down one of the Allied planes forcing the pilot, McMillan, to bail out. The other pilot, Culpepper, lands to rescue him just in time. Culpepper's plane is damaged. The tank continues in pursuit.

Cast
 Lloyd Bridges as General Ernst Beimler
 Roy Thinnes as Arnold McMillan
 Eric Braeden as Stoeffer
 Doug McClure as Lieutenant Del Culpepper
 Brendon Boone as Private Huffman
 Christopher Cary as British Radioman
 Dennis Rucker as Lieutenant Voelke
 Dennis Dugan as Private Becker
 Ivor Barry as Major Waverly
 William Beckley as British Airman
 Eric Micklewood as British Officer

Reception
The Los Angeles Times called it "a good suspense drama" which "is scarcely original enough to be anywhere near profound, but it does make its point emphatically in a way that's entertaining, especially for action fans."

References

External links

Death Race at Letterbox DVD

1973 television films
1973 films
ABC Movie of the Week
American television films
American war films
1970s English-language films
1970s American films